Di Dongsheng (born 1976) is an associate dean and professor of international political economy and international relations at the School of International Studies (SIS) of the Renmin University of China (RUC). Di is also a senior research fellow at the International Monetary Institute of RUC and a member of the Centre for International Security and Strategy (CISS) at Tsinghua University, a think tank closely affiliated with the International Liaison Department of the Chinese Communist Party (IDCPC), the Ministry of Industry and Information Technology (MIIT), and the Chinese Ministry of Foreign Affairs.

Career 
Since 1994, he has been a student and later a professor at Renmin University of China. He has also been a visiting scholar or a part-time lecturer at Sciences Po, Vrije Universiteit Brussel, Boston University Brussels, and Georgetown University.

Di's research interests include the international political economy of money and financial systems, China's economic foreign relations, and the political economy of the United States. Since 1999, he has published a number of scholarly articles in both Chinese and English.

Public speech 

In a public speech on November 28, 2020, Di allegedly boasted before a live audience about China's influence in America's "core inner circle of power", especially in relation to the incoming administration of president-elect Joe Biden, saying "Biden is back! Our old friend is back!" Di, who was speaking at an event hosted by the Chinese nationalistic video channel Guan Video (官视频), bragged about Beijing's sway over Wall Street and Biden's son Hunter, whose previous business dealings in China had recently come under scrutiny.

The video of the speech went viral on Chinese social media but was quickly censored and deleted by Chinese officials. It was also the subject of much controversy overseas, attracting the attention of outlets such as Fox News, New York Post and South China Morning Post. The video was cited by journalist and writer Glenn Greenwald as evidence of the influence by the Chinese Communist Party (CCP) within the Biden administration through familial connections. A segment of the video of Di's speech was also shared by US President Donald Trump on Twitter.

Li Hengqing, director of Information & Strategy Institute, a Washington, D.C. think tank, told Radio Free Asia that Di's speech attracted the attention of the US political establishment, and it was reportedly translated into English and circulated among government agencies. Li said that Di's remarks exposed the CCP's political corruption model, which is "using money to create guanxi".

Works

Books

References 

1976 births
Living people
Academic staff of Renmin University of China
Renmin University of China alumni
People from Qidong, Jiangsu